were a popular Japanese punk rock band that was formed in 1995. The band stopped all activities in November 2005 and broke up.

Members
 Hiroto Kōmoto – vocals, harmonica, occasional rhythm guitar
 Masatoshi Mashima –guitar, backing vocals, occasional lead vocals
 Sakito Shirabe – bass
 Kenji Ōshima – drums
 Mikio Shirai – keyboards

Kōmoto and Mashima used to be in The Blue Hearts, with Shirai occasionally supporting them. Shirai left before the recording of their final album, and the band continued as a 4-piece without replacing him. In August 2006, Kōmoto and Mashima created a new band, The Cro-Magnons.

Discography

Original albums 
 The High-Lows (October 25, 1995) (Oricon No. 5)
 Tigermobile (December 6, 1996)  (Oricon No. 6)
  (May 8, 1998) (Oricon No. 5) - Jacket design by Downtown's Hitoshi Matsumoto
  (June 9, 1999) (Oricon No. 8)
 Relaxin' With the High-Lows (June 9, 2000) (Oricon No. 3)
 Hotel Tiki-Poto (September 5, 2001) (Oricon No. 4)
 Angel Beetle (November 27, 2002) (Oricon No. 6)
 Do!! The★Mustang (September 1, 2004) (Oricon No. 9)

Mini-albums 
 4×5 (May 14, 1997) (Oricon No. 9)
  (December 1, 1999) (Oricon No. 25)

Compilation albums 
 Flip Flop (January 24, 2000) (Oricon No. 4)
 Flip Flop 2 (November 12, 2003) (Oricon No. 10)
 Flash ~Best~ (January 1, 2006)

Singles 
  (October 25, 1995) (Oricon No. 45)
  (November 25, 1995) (Oricon No. 100)
  (January 25, 1996) (Oricon No. 40)
  (February 21, 1996) (Oricon No. 10) - first opening theme to the anime Detective Conan
  (June 24, 1996) (Oricon No. 10)
  (December 6, 1996) (Oricon No. 45)
 "Happy Go Lucky" (February 14, 1997) (Oricon No. 56)
  (June 11, 1997) (Oricon No. 44)
  (April 29, 1998) (Oricon No. 39) - Jacket design by Downtown's Hitoshi Matsumoto
  (August 26, 1998) (Oricon No. 45) - Jacket design by Downtown's Hitoshi Matsumoto
  (December 16, 1998) (Oricon No. 27)
  (April 21, 1999) (Oricon No. 24)
  (June 9, 1999) (Oricon No. 33)
  (May 24, 2000) (Oricon No. 8)
 "FLOWER" (September 6, 2000) (Oricon No. 18)
  (August 8, 2001) (Oricon No. 15)
  (October 11, 2001) (Oricon No. 30)
  (February 20, 2002) (Oricon No. 15)
 "Too Late To Die" (September 4, 2002) (Oricon No. 15)
  (November 6, 2002) (Oricon No. 20)
  (June 25, 2003) (Oricon No. 9)
  (February 11, 2004) (Oricon No. 20) - Theme song for the Zebraman film
  (June 9, 2004) (Oricon No. 10)
  (July 21, 2004) (Oricon No. 16)
  (December 15, 2004) (Oricon No. 26)
  (May 18, 2005) (Oricon No. 16)

Videos 
  (VHS, March 6, 1996; extended DVD, December 9, 2001)
  (VHS, March 5, 1997; extended DVD, December 19, 2001)
 that summer feeling (VHS/DVD, December 19, 2001)
 Puttin' on the Style (w/The Quarrymen) (DVD, June 9, 2004)
 The★Mustang 04-05 (DVD, September 21, 2005)
 Flash Back: Vol. 1 (DVD, February 22, 2006)
 Flash Back: Vol. 2 (DVD, February 22, 2006)
 Trash Bag (DVD, May 24, 2006)

References

External links 
  

Japanese punk rock groups
Japanese rock music groups
Musical quintets
Musical groups established in 1995
Musical groups disestablished in 2005